Dr.Web is a software suite developed by Russian anti-malware company Doctor Web. First released in 1992, it became the first anti-virus service in Russia.

The company also offers anti-spam solutions and is used by Yandex to scan e-mail attachments. It also features an add-on for all major browsers which checks links with the online version of Dr Web.

Dr.Web has withdrawn from AV tests such as Virus Bulletin VB100% around 2008 stating that they believe that virus scans on viruses are different subject from that of real world malware attacks.

Critics, reviews and reliability
Staunch anti-adware policy led to software developers complaining that Dr.Web treated their virus free applications as a "virus". When developers tried contacting Dr.Web to resolve the issue, developers received no response.

Notable discoveries

Flashback Trojan 

Dr.Web discovered the Trojan BackDoor.Flashback variant that affected more than 600,000 Macs.

Trojan.Skimer.18 
Dr.Web discovered the Trojan.Skimer.18, a Trojan that works like an ATM software skimmer. The Trojan can intercept and transmit bank card information processed by ATMs as well as data stored on the card and its PIN code.

Linux.Encoder.1 
Dr.Web discovered the ransomware Linux.Encoder.1 that affected more than 2,000 Linux users. Linux.Encoder.2 which was discovered later turned out to be an earlier version of this ransomware.

Trojan.Skimer discovery and attacks on Doctor Web offices 
Doctor Web received a threat supposedly from the Trojan writers or criminal organization sponsoring this malware's development and promotion: On March 31, 2014, after two arson attacks were carried out on Igor Daniloff's anti-virus laboratory in St. Petersburg, company received a second threat. Doctor Web released a statement that the company considers it its duty to provide users with the ultimate protection against the encroachments of cybercriminals and consequently, efforts aimed at identifying and studying ATM threats with their ATM Shield.

See also

 Antivirus software
 Comparison of antivirus software
 Comparison of computer viruses

References

External links
  

Antivirus software
Computer security software companies
Lua (programming language)-scriptable software
Russian brands
Software companies of Russia